Toussaint-Gaspard Taconet (July 1730 –– 29 December 1774) was an 18th-century French comic actor, the main character in Jean-Baptiste Nicolet's plays. He made his debut as machinist at the Opéra de Paris, then was a prompter at the Comédie-Française and the Opéra-Comique.

He had many farces and comedies presented and published.

Sources

External links 
 All his plays and their presentations on CÉSAR
 Works by Taconet
 Books by Taconet

18th-century French male actors
French male stage actors
18th-century French dramatists and playwrights
Troupe of the Comédie-Française
1730 births
1774 deaths